The 1974 NAIA men's basketball tournament was held in March at Municipal Auditorium in Kansas City, Missouri. The 37th annual NAIA basketball tournament featured 32 teams playing in a single-elimination format. It would be the last tournament to be played in Municipal until 2002. In 1975 would be held in the new Kemper Arena.  Kemper would host the NAIA Tournament until 1993, when the NAIA would move the tournament and its offices to Tulsa.

Awards and honors
Leading scorer:
Leading rebounder:
Player of the Year: est. 1994

1974 NAIA bracket

  * denotes double overtime.

Third-place game
The third-place game featured the losing teams from the national semifinalist to determine 3rd and 4th places in the tournament. This game was played until 1988.

See also
 1974 NCAA Division I basketball tournament
 1974 NCAA Division II basketball tournament

References

NAIA Men's Basketball Championship
Tournament
NAIA men's basketball tournament
NAIA men's basketball tournament
College basketball tournaments in Missouri
Basketball competitions in Kansas City, Missouri